The United States Mint Proof Set, commonly known as the Proof Set in the United States, is a set of proof coins sold by the United States Mint.  The proof set is popular with coin collectors as it is an affordable way to collect examples of United States coinage in proof condition.

Standard proof sets (1936–present)

Pre-war proof sets (1936–1942) 
In 1936, the US Mint produced proof coinage for collectors for the first time since 1916, when the mint had shut down proof production due to lack of interest from collectors. Like previous proof coinage, the new coins could be bought individually, but unlike previous coins, they were also offered as a set. Proof cents and nickels produced in early 1936 had a satin finish, which was unpopular with collectors as it closely resembled the standard circulation strike finish. Therefore, later 1936 pennies and nickels featured the mirror-like "brilliant" finish used on the other coins of the set.

Halfway through 1942, following the outbreak of World War II, the composition of the nickel temporarily changed from cupronickel to 35% silver.  Only the cupronickel version was included in the 1942 proof set, but a proof silver nickel (identified by the P mint mark on the reverse) was sold separately later that year. Later that year proof coinage was discontinued as the Mint was busy striking millions of medals for military awards.

Post-war proof sets (1950–1964) 
Proof coinage production continued in 1950, although the mint no longer sold proof coins individually. Because of this, mintages for all proof coins in a year were the same.

1964 was the final year that the Philadelphia Mint produced proof sets. Then, starting the next year, through 1967, all mints produced coins without mint marks, as a shortage of coins was blamed on coin collectors. No proof sets or uncirculated mint sets were produced by the mint in those years, and instead "Special Mint Sets" containing circulation coins featuring a satin finish were sold to collectors. Although these sets were neither proof sets nor true uncirculated sets, they are collected by proof set collectors to complete their "yearly" proof set collections.

San Francisco proof sets (1968–present) 

In 1968, the mint started producing coins with mint marks again. Proof sets were once again produced also, with production of proof coins being taken over by the San Francisco Mint. Therefore, most post-1968 proof coins feature the S mint mark (error coins that lack the mint mark exist, and some special edition proof coins were produced by the Philadelphia and West Point Mints). Since 1975, San Francisco has only struck coins for collectors and investors, with the proof set being its main product (one major exception is the Susan B. Anthony dollar, produced 1979–1981).

In 1973, the dollar coin made its debut in the proof set in the form of the Eisenhower dollar. This coin proved unpopular in circulation and was discontinued in favor of the Susan B. Anthony dollar in 1979, which was also unpopular and also discontinued in 1981. The 1982 proof set contained a Department of the Treasury token in place of the dollar. It wasn't until 2000 that the dollar made a comeback in the proof set as the gold-colored Sacagawea dollar.  Another dollar coin to be included in the proof set was the Presidential dollar, which was introduced in 2007 and produced alongside the Sacagawea dollar.  Although popular with collectors, the dollar coin once again proved unpopular in circulation and was discontinued for circulation after 2011. , however, the Sacagawea dollar continues to be available in the proof set (the Presidential $1 coin program ended in 2016).

Both the 1975 and 1976 proof sets contained the Bicentennial quarters, half dollars, and dollars featuring the double date 1776–1976. This was due to the fact that the mint did not produce those coins dated 1975, and the bicentennial coins were produced both years.

From 1999 through 2008, five 50 State quarters were included in the mint set each year. In 2004 and 2005, the Westward Journey nickels were also included in the set, adding an extra nickel in both sets.  The 2009 proof set contained the highest number of coins and the highest combined face value ($7.19) of any proof set as of 2019, containing the four Lincoln Bicentennial cents (with a special composition of 95% copper), all six District of Columbia and United States Territories quarters, five dollar coins, and the standard nickel, dime, and half dollar. In 2019, a penny featuring the W mint mark (indicating that it was minted at West Point Mint) was included in the mint set, this was the first time a penny featured the mint mark. The same was done with the nickel in 2020.

Silver proof sets (1976; 1992–present) 

In 1976, the mint released a proof set containing the Bicentennial quarter, half dollar, and dollar struck in 40% silver.

The Silver Proof set became a standard product of the United States Mint in 1992, containing a dime, quarter, and half dollar composed of 90% silver.  The compositions for the penny, nickel, and dollar (introduced to the set in 2000) remained the same as in the standard proof sets.  In 2019, the purity of the silver coins was changed to 99.9%.

The 2019 Silver Proof Set contains a "West Point" penny with a reverse cameo finish.  Similarly, the 2020 set includes a reverse cameo "West Point" nickel.

Limited Edition silver proof sets (2012–present) 
Since 2012, the San Francisco Mint issued special limited edition Silver Proof Sets containing only the silver coins of the standard set, plus a proof American Silver Eagle.  The sets have a mintage limit of 50,000 each.  No set was issued for 2015.  Like the standard Silver Proof Set, all coins in the set are made with a composition of 99.9% starting in 2019.

Prestige proof sets (1983–1997) 
In 1983, the mint released a special mint set containing a commemorative dollar coin.  This set, known as the Prestige proof set, was sold every year until 1997 (except 1985, when no commemorative coins were produced) containing a commemorative dollar coin and sometimes a commemorative half dollar.

Other proof sets

50 State Quarters Proof Set 
With the launch of the 50 State Quarters Program in 1999, the Mint began marketing proof sets of just the five quarters released in the given year. These sets are essentially a reduced version of the regular issue proof sets and the packaging maintained the same blue color scheme, but came in a smaller box and different certificate of authenticity. This collection ceased with the resolution of the program in 2008. These sets are usually denoted as the 5-piece sets from a given year. All issues were produced at the San Francisco Mint.

50 State Quarters Silver Proof Set 
The 50 State Quarters Proof Sets produced with the five quarters produced that year in 90% silver and again were the same as the year's Silver Proof Set but in a reduced red packaging and unique certificate of authenticity. All issues were produced at the San Francisco Mint.

District of Columbia and U.S. Territories Quarters Proof Set 
Upon completion of the 50 State Quarters Program, it was decided to honor Washington D.C. and the U.S. Overseas Territories in a similar manner. The District of Columbia and United States Territories Quarters allowed for the minting of six designs in 2009 and these were sold as a set. All were produced at the San Francisco Mint.

America the Beautiful Quarters Proof Set 
The America the Beautiful Quarters program began in 2010 as a continuation of the 50 State Quarters and D.C. and Territories programs, allowing each state a representation in the nation's coinage. These sets are reduced versions of the United States Mint Proof Set and the packaging maintains the same burnt-orange color scheme, but came in a smaller box and different certificate of authenticity. All issues were produced at the San Francisco Mint.

America the Beautiful Quarters Silver Proof Set 
The 50 State Quarters Proof Sets are also produced in 90% silver and again are the same as the year's Silver Proof Set but in a reduced navy-blue packaging and unique certificate of authenticity. All issues were produced at the San Francisco Mint.

Presidential $1 Coin Proof Set 
With the launch of the Presidential $1 Coin Program, four dollar coins have been released each year since 2007 - each depicting a serving U.S. President. This set is the sleeve of dollar coins from regular issue mint sets on its own with reduced packaging and a different certificate of authenticity. The program ended in 2016 when all eligible presidents had been honored.

50th Anniversary San Francisco Silver Reverse Proof Set 
A special Silver Proof Set was issued by the San Francisco Mint in 2018. This set contained the same coins as the standard 2018 Silver Proof Set, but with a reverse cameo finish, and had a maximum authorized mintage of 200,000 sets.

American Innovation Dollar Proof Set and Reverse Proof Set 
After the 2018 introduction of the American Innovation dollars program, the Mint began releasing proof sets containing one example of each coin minted that year. The first set, released in December 2018, contained only one coin, the introductory piece, while future sets contain each of the four coins issued that year.

The Reverse Proof coins were originally released as individually packaged coins, starting with the introductory coin, (released in August 2019), and continuing for the next two years, with two 2019-S coins going on sale in 2020 and one 2020-S coin going on sale in 2021. Starting with the 2021 coins, the individually packed coins were discontinued in favor of a four-coin Reverse Proof set, released in November that year.

Other modern proof coins 
Some special proof coins were not included in any of the above-mentioned proof sets, but were sold individually by the mint or in commemorative sets.

References 

Coins of the United States